Kym may refer to:
River Kym, in Cambridgeshire, England
Kym (singer) (born 1983), or Jin Sha, Chinese singer and actress
Know Your Meme, an internet meme documentation blog
Kpatili language's ISO 639 code

People with the given name
Kym Bonython (1920–2011), member of Adelaide society
Kym Dillon, sports presenter for Nine News Adelaide
Kym Gyngell (born 1952), Australian comedian and film, television and stage actor
Kym Hodgeman, former Australian rules footballer
Kym Howe (born 1980), Australian athlete
Kym Karath (born 1958), American actress
Kym Johnson (born 1976), Australian professional ballroom dancer and television performer
Kym Lomas (born 1976), English actress and former singer
Kym Mazelle (born 1960), American dance-pop, Hi-NRG, soul and house singer
Kym Ng, Singaporean actress and television host
Kym Richardson (born 1958), Australian politician
Kym Sims (born 1966), American singer
Kym Valentine (born 1977), Australian actress
Kym Whitley (born 1961), American actress and comedian
Kym Wilson (born 1973), Australian actress

People with the surname
Jérôme Kym (born 2003), Swiss tennis player

See also
 Kim (disambiguation)
 Kum (disambiguation)
 Keum (disambiguation)
 Khim
 Jin (Chinese surname)
 Jin (Korean surname)
 Ghim
 Qin (surname)